Raymundo Almanza Morales (alias El Gori III) is a Mexican suspected drug lord and former high-ranking member of Los Zetas, a criminal group based in Tamaulipas, Mexico. Almanza Morales was in the Mexican Armed Forces prior to his involvement in organized crime. He was infantry soldier and was discharged on August 14, 1999, at his own request. He was captured on 22 May 2009 in Monterrey, Nuevo Leon, Mexico.

See also
 List of Mexico's 37 most-wanted drug lords

References

Mexican crime bosses
Living people
Los Zetas
Year of birth missing (living people)